Last Supper is a 1568 painting by Greek painter  sculptor and architect of the Spanish Renaissance Doménikos Theotokópoulos (1541–1614), most widely known as El Greco.

The work is currently collected in the Pinacoteca Nazionale di Bologna.

References

External links
Cuadro.artehistoria.jcyl.es.

1568 paintings
Paintings by El Greco
El Greco